The Eau d'Heure lakes is a complex of five artificial lakes in Wallonia, forming the largest lake area in Belgium.

The dams were built during the 1970s. They are within the municipalities of Cerfontaine (province of Namur) and Froidchapelle (province of Hainaut).

The primary river feeding the lakes is the Eau d'Heure. There are five dams and one hydro-electric power station.

It is a popular tourist attraction, with water sports, including fishing, kayaking, diving and windsurfing.

The five lakes are:
 Lac de l'Eau d'Heure, the central lake of the complex
 Lac de Falemprise, a medium-sized lake to the south-east
 Lac de Féronval, a small lake at the north end of Lac de l'Eau d'Heure
 Lac du Ry Jaune (sometimes spelled Ri Jaune), a small lake on the east side

References
 Official Website
 Awarded "EDEN - European Destinations of Excellence" non traditional tourist destination 2010

External links
 
 

Reservoirs in Belgium
Lakes of the Ardennes (Belgium)
Lakes of Hainaut (province)
Lakes of Namur (province)
REau D'heure